The Men's road race H2 cycling event at the 2012 Summer Paralympics took place on September 7 at Brands Hatch. Fourteen riders from seven different nations competed. The race distance was 56 km.

Results
LAP=Lapped (8 km).

References

Men's road race H2